The 2021 Nebraska Cornhuskers football team represented the University of Nebraska as a member of the West Division of the Big Ten Conference during the 2021 NCAA Division I FBS football season. The team was led by fourth-year head coach Scott Frost and played its games at Memorial Stadium in Lincoln, Nebraska .

Previous season
The 2020 season saw a conference-only schedule and the Cornhuskers finished with a 3-5 record and finished in fifth place for the second year in a row in the Big Ten West Division. Nebraska did not attend a bowl for the fourth year in a row, even though they could have participated.

Offseason

2021 NFL Draft
The following players declared for the 2021 NFL Draft:

Transfers

Outgoing

Incoming

Recruits
The Cornhuskers signed a total of 20 scholarship recruits and 20 walk-ons during national signing period.

Scholarship recruits

Walk-on recruits

Preseason

Award watch lists

Preseason Big Ten Media poll and awards
Below are the results of the preseason Big Ten media poll with total points received next to each school and first-place votes in parentheses. For the 2021 poll, Ohio State was voted as the favorite to win both the East Division and the Big Ten Championship Game. This is the 11th iteration of the preseason media poll conducted by Cleveland.com, which polls at least one credentialed media member for each Big Ten team. Only three times in the last 11 years has the media accurately predicted the Big Ten champion. 

Below are the results of the annual Preseason Big Ten Player of the Year awards conducted by Cleveland.com.

Schedule

The Big Ten released a revised conference schedule on February 5, 2021 to correct home/away matchups that were altered from the 2020 COVID-stricken season.

Personnel

Roster

Due to COVID-19, the NCAA granted an extra year of eligibility to student-athletes who competed during the 2020-21 season where it would not count against a student's years of eligibility. As a result, all returning players are listed as the same class as 2020.

Depth chart

Game summaries

at Illinois

vs Fordham (FCS)

vs Buffalo

at No. 3 Oklahoma

at No. Michigan State

vs Northwestern

vs No. 9 Michigan

at Minnesota

vs Purdue

vs No. 5 Ohio State

at No. 15 Wisconsin

vs No. 17 Iowa

Big Ten Awards

Player of the Week Honors

All-Conference Awards

2021 Big Ten Offense All-Conference Teams and Awards

National Awards

All-America Awards

Rankings

Players drafted into the NFL

References

Nebraska
Nebraska Cornhuskers football seasons
Nebraska Cornhuskers football